An Automatic Lubrication System (ALS), sometimes referred to as a Centralized Lubrication System (CLS),is a system that delivers controlled amounts of lubricant to multiple locations on a machine while the machine is operating.  Even though these systems are usually fully automated, a system that requires a manual pump or button activation is still identified as a centralized lubrication system. The system can be classified into two different categories that can share a lot of the same components.

Oil systems: Oil systems primary use is for stationary manufacturing equipment such as CNC milling

Grease systems: Grease primary use is on mobile units such as trucks, mining or construction equipment.

Automatic lubrication systems are key aspects in maintenance & reliability programs. They supply lube points with metered amounts of grease or oil from a central location. The pump supplies the system with the chosen lubricant and is fed from a reservoir that is easily accessible. Depending on the application, the reservoir ranges in sizes and can be as small as 2 liters all the way up to an intermediate bulk container or even a bulk tank. The options are almost limitless and are application specific. These systems have the option to be monitored remotely with feedback and can be tied directly into your plant's PLC. So whether you're running an excavator, driving a ready-mix truck, operating a crusher, or making steel, you can rest assured that your assets are being properly lubricated at all times.

Reasons for Automatic Lubrication Systems 
Automatic lubrication systems or centralized lubrication system s are designed to apply lubricant in precise, metered amounts over short, frequent time intervals.  Time and human resource constraints and often the physical location on the machine often makes it impractical to manually lubricate the points.  As a result, production cycles, machine availability, and manpower availability dictate the intervals at which machinery is lubricated, which is not optimal for the point requiring lubrication.  Automatic lubrication systems are installed on machinery to circumvent these issues.

Benefits 
Auto lube systems have many advantages over traditional methods of manual lubrication:
 All critical components are lubricated, regardless of location or ease of access 
 Lubrication occurs while the machinery is in operation, causing the lubricant to be equally distributed within the bearing and increasing the machine's availability. 
 Proper lubrication of critical components ensures safe operation of the machinery.
 Less wear on the components means extended component life, fewer breakdowns, reduced downtime, reduced replacement costs and reduced maintenance costs
 Measured lubrication amounts means no wasted lubricant
 Safety - no climbing around machinery or inaccessible areas (gases, exhaust, confined spaces, etc.)
 Lower energy consumption due to less friction
 Increased overall productivity resulting from increase in machine availability and reduction in downtime due to breakdowns or general maintenance

Components 
A typical system consists of controller/timer, pump w/reservoir, supply line, metering valves, and feed lines. Regardless of the manufacturer or type of system, all automatic lubrication systems share these 5 main components:
 Controller/Timer – activates the system to distribute lubrication can be linked to a POS system. 
 Pump with Reservoir – stores and provides the lubricant to the system
 Supply Line – line that connects the pump to the metering valves or injectors. The lubricant is pumped through this.
 Metering Valves/Injectors– component that measures/dispenses the lubricant to the application points.
 Feed lines - line that connects the metering valves or injectors to the application points. The lubricant is pumped through this.

Types 
There are several different types of automatic lubrication systems including:
 Single Line Parallel systems
 Dual Line Parallel systems
 Single Point Automatics
 Single Line Progressive systems (or Series Progressive)
 Single Line Resistance
 Oil Mist and Air-Oil systems
 Oil re-circulating 
 Chain lube systems
The 4 most commonly used Automatic Lubrication System types are:
 Single Line Parallel, 
 Dual Line Parallel and 
 Single Line Progressive.
 Multi port direct lubricators

Single line progressive 

A single line progressive system uses lubricant flow to cycle individual metering valves and valve assemblies.  The valves consist of dispensing pistons moving back and forth in a specific bore.  Each piston depends on flow from the previous piston to shift and displace lubricant.  If one piston doesn't shift, none of the following pistons will shift.  Valve output is not adjustable.

Operation begins when the controller/timer sends a signal to the pump to start the lube event. The pump then feeds lubricant into the supply line which connects to the primary metering valve, for either a preprogrammed amount of time or number of times as monitored through a designated piston cycle switch.  Lubricant is fed to the multiple lubrication points one after another via secondary progressive metering valves sized for each series of lubrication points, and then directly to each point via the feed lines.

Single line parallel 

The first single-line parallel system for industry was introduced in 1937 by Lincoln Engineering (now known as Lincoln Industrial) in the United States.

A single line parallel system can service a single machine, different zones on a single machine or even several separate machines and is ideal when the volume of lubricant varies for each point. In this type of system, a central pump station automatically delivers lubricant through a single supply line to multiple branches of injectors.  Each injector serves a single lubrication point, operates independently and may be individually adjusted to deliver the desired amount of lubricant.

Operation begins when the controller/timer sends a signal to the pump starting the lube cycle.  The pump begins pumping lubricant to build up pressure in the supply line connecting the pump to the injectors.  Once the required pressure is reached, the lube injectors dispense a predetermined amount of lubricant to the lubrication points via feed lines.

Once the entire system reaches the required pressure, a pressure switch sends a signal to the controller indicating that grease has cycled through to all the distribution points.  The pump shuts off.  Pressure is vented out of the system and grease in the line is redirected back to the pump reservoir, until the normal system pressure level is restored.

Dual line parallel 

A dual line parallel system is similar to the single line parallel system in that it uses hydraulic pressure to cycle adjustable valves to dispense measured shots of lubricant.  It has 2 main supply lines which are alternatively used as pressure / vent lines.  The advantage of a two-line system is that it can handle hundreds of lubrication points from a single pump station over several thousand feet using significantly smaller tubing or pipe.

Operation begins when the controller/timer sends a signal to the pump to start the lubrication cycle.  The pump begins pumping lubricant to build up pressure in the first (the pressure) supply line while simultaneously venting the second (vent) return line.  Once the required pressure is reached, a predetermined amount of lubricant is dispensed by the metering devices to half of the lubrication points via feed lines.

Once the pressure switch monitoring main supply line pressure indicates a preset pressure in the line has been reached, the system is hydraulically closed.  The controller shuts off the pump and signals a changeover valve to redirect lubricant to the second main supply line.

The next time the controller activates the system, the second main line now becomes the pressure line while the first line becomes the vent line. The second line is pressurized and the entire process is repeated lubricating the remaining lube points.

Multi point direct lubricator

When the controller in the pump or external controller activates the drive motor, a set of cams turns and activates individual injectors or pump elements to dispense a fixed amount of lubricant to each individual lubrication point.  Systems are easy to design,  direct pump to lube point without added accessories and easy to troubleshoot.

See also 
Tribology

References 

Lubrication

fr:Lubrification
ja:潤滑